ProFe is a Czech aircraft manufacturer. The company was founded in 1992 by Václav Brandejs and Ivan Brandejs to produce kit aircraft, particularly gliders and motor gliders.

The company also manufactures glider trailers.

Aircraft

References

External links

Aircraft manufacturers of the Czech Republic and Czechoslovakia
Manufacturing companies established in 1992
Czech brands
1992 establishments in Czechoslovakia